Holidays in the United States Virgin Islands include all official holidays of the United States as well as religious and secular holidays designated by the Government of the Virgin Islands.

Public holidays

Carnival
In addition to these holidays, all three islands celebrate multi-day carnivals. V.I. Carnival takes place in St. Thomas in April/May, St. John Carnival is in June/July, and St. Croix's Crucian Festival is in December/January. The Virgin Islands Government regularly grants administrative leave to its employees for various Carnival-related events (such as Food Fair, J'ouvert, Children's Parade and Adults' Parade), and schools are closed during the culmination of V.I. Carnival.

See also
 List of holidays by country

References

 
United States Virgin Islands-related lists